"Surround Me with Love" is a song written by Wayland Holyfield and Norro Wilson, and recorded by American country music artist Charly McClain.  It was released in April 1981 as the first single and title track from the album Surround Me with Love.  The song reached #5 on the Billboard  Hot Country Singles & Tracks chart.

Chart performance

References

1981 singles
1981 songs
Charly McClain songs
Songs written by Wayland Holyfield
Songs written by Norro Wilson
Epic Records singles